Deleted in lymphocytic leukemia 2 (non-protein coding) is a long non-coding RNA that in humans is encoded by the DLEU2 gene. In humans it is located on chromosome 13q14. The DLEU2 gene was originally identified as a potential tumour suppressor gene and is often deleted in patients with B-cell chronic lymphocytic leukemia.

See also 
Long non-coding RNA

References

Further reading 

 
 
 
 
 
 

Non-coding RNA